Andrey Kuznetsov was the defending champion but chose not to defend his title.

Roman Safiullin won the title after defeating Denis Yevseyev 2–6, 6–4, 7–6(7–2) in the final.

Seeds

Draw

Finals

Top half

Bottom half

References

External links
Main draw
Qualifying draw

President's Cup - 1
2022 Men's singles